Ms. Mary Mallon is the debut EP by Canadian progressive metal band Today I Caught the Plague. Released in 2008 Independently.

Track listing

Personnel
Today I Caught the Plague
Dave Journeaux – vocals & keyboard
Ben Davis – guitar
Steve Rennie - guitar
Mike Ieradi - drums
Matt Belanger - bass guitar

Production
Produced by Dean Hadjichristou
Mastered by Alan Douches
 Arrangement and Song Writing Credits to Aaron Homma, Ryan Berthiaume, and Pete Saumure

References

The Kindred (band) albums
2008 albums